John Puxton (died 1627) was an English politician.

He was a Member (MP) of the Parliament of England for Salisbury in 1601.

References

16th-century births
1627 deaths
16th-century English people
English MPs 1601